George Thomas may refer to:

Politicians
Sir George Thomas, 1st Baronet (died 1774), deputy governor of Pennsylvania 1738–1747, governor of the Leeward Islands 1753–1766
Sir George Thomas, 3rd Baronet (c. 1740–1815), British MP for Arundel
George M. Thomas (American politician) (1828–1914), U.S. Representative from Kentucky
George Y. Thomas (1882–1940), merchant and political figure in Nova Scotia, Canada
George T. Thomas (1856–1920), Republican politician from Ohio
George Thomas, 1st Viscount Tonypandy (1909–1997), British Labour Party politician, Speaker of the House of Commons
George Thomas (Indian politician) (1926–1993), Indian politician
George M. Thomas (Indian politician) (born 1955), Communist Party of India politician

Sports
George C. Thomas Jr. (1873–1932), American golf course designer
Sir George Thomas, 7th Baronet (1881–1972), British chess and badminton player
George Thomas (halfback) (1928–1989), American football halfback and defensive back
George Thomas (wide receiver) (born 1964), American football wide receiver
George Thomas (baseball) (born 1937), American baseball player
George Thomas (badminton) (born 1966), Indian badminton player
George Thomas (canoeist), canoer from New Zealand
George Thomas (English cricketer) (born 2003)
George Thomas (Indian cricketer), cricketer from India
George Thomas (footballer, born 1857) (1857–?), Welsh international footballer
George Thomas (footballer, born 1930) (1930–2014), Welsh football player for Newport County
George Thomas (footballer, born 1997), Welsh football player who plays for Queens Park Rangers
George Thomas (golfer), American golfer
George Thomas (rugby, born 1881) (1881–1916), rugby union and rugby league footballer of the 1900s and 1910s for Pontnewydd (RU), Newport, Great Britain (RL), Wales, and Warrington
George Thomas (rugby union, born 1857) (1857–1934), rugby union footballer of the 1880s and 1990s for Wales, and Newport

Others
George Thomas (soldier) (c. 1756–1802), Irish mercenary, active in 18th century India, also known as the "Irish Raja"
George Thomas (surveyor) (1781–1850), Royal Navy hydrographic surveyor
George Henry Thomas (1816–1870), American Civil War general
George Housman Thomas (1824–1868), English painter and illustrator 
George Thomas (entrepreneur), African-American valet, impresario in Russia under Tsar Nicholas II
George Holt Thomas (1879–1929), aviation industry pioneer and newspaper proprietor
George Washington Thomas (1883–1937), American blues and jazz pianist and songwriter
George B. Thomas (1914–2006), mathematician
George Leo Thomas (born 1950), American Roman Catholic prelate
George Thomas (educator) (died 1951), American academic administrator
K. George Thomas, Indian photochemist
George Geovonni Thomas (born 1983), American criminal convicted of the 2007 kidnapping, rape, and murders of Channon Christian and Christopher Newsom

See also